The Chakma Circle (Chakma: 𑄌𑄇𑄴𑄟𑄳𑄦 𑄥𑄢𑄴𑄇𑄬𑄣𑄴), also known as the Chakma Raj, is one of three hereditary chiefdoms (or "circles") in the Chittagong Hill Tracts of modern-day Bangladesh. The Chakma Circle encompasses parts of Rangamati Hill District and Dighinala and Rajasthali Upazilas in neighbouring Khagrachari District and Bandarban District respectively. The chiefdom's members are of Chakma descent.

Leadership 
The Chakma Circle is led by a hereditary chieftain called a "raja," whose role encompasses judicial, administrative, ceremonial, legal and social responsibilities. Political power is passed from the father to the first-born son.

The incumbent chieftain is Devasish Roy (b. 10 April 1959), according to the Chakma Bijok, a compilation of the Chakma history (1876-1934 CE). The Chakma chieftain also sits on the Advisory Council for the Ministry of Chittagong Hill Tracts Affairs and the Rangamati Hill District Council. The Chakma chieftain leads a "rajpunnah" festival.

History

Pre-colonial era
The lineage of Chakma chieftains may date to the 11th century or mid-16th century. Chakma folklore and tradition ascribe the Chakma origins to the warrior castes of Bhagalpur in modern-day India. The legendary raja Bijoy Giri (c. 1630), who is believed to have migrated the ancestors of the Chakma people north of the Naf River. Through intermarriages with the Rakhine people, the Chakmas eventually converted to Buddhism. Extant historical records date to the 1700s. Following the expansion of the Mughal Empire into Chakma territory, Chakma chieftains adopted Muslim names and titles (e.g., Khan) in exchange for tributary payments.

British rule and modern era 
During British rule, the Chittagong Hill Tracts were administratively divided into three circles in 1884, namely the Chakma Circle, the Bohmong Circle, and the Mong Circles, each presided over by a hereditary chief from the Chakma and Marma peoples. The circles were codified into law with the Chittagong Hill Tracts Regulations, 1900, which eased revenue collection and administrative burdens on British authorities by delegating tax collection, land administration management and social arbitration responsibilities to the chieftains. In 1901, the Bohmong Circle extended . This administrative structure remained in place until 1964, when the introduction of local self-government abolished the special status of these circles and brought local administration under the control of the central government.

List of leaders
46. Kalindi Rani (1832-1873)
47. Harish Chandra Rai Bahadur (1873-1885)
47A. Court of Wards (Nil Chandra Dewan & Trilochan Dewan) (1885-1897)
48. Bhuvan Mohan Roy (1897-1934)
49. Nalinaksha Roy (1934-1951)
50. Tridev Roy (1951-1971)
50A. Samit Roy [Regent](1971-1977)
51. Devashish Roy (1977–present)

See also 
 Chakma people
 Marma people
 Bohmong Circle
 Mong Circle

References 

.
Chakma people
 
Rangamati Hill District
Subdivisions of British India
Dynasties of Bengal
Quasi-princely estates of India
Lands inhabited by indigenous peoples
History of Chittagong Division
Bangladeshi families